Trichocylliba is a genus of tortoise mites in the family Uropodidae. There are about seven described species in Trichocylliba.

Species
These seven species belong to the genus Trichocylliba:
 Trichocylliba aguaboae Hirschmann, 1992
 Trichocylliba chiapensis Elzinga
 Trichocylliba napoensis Elzinga
 Trichocylliba praedator Elzinga
 Trichocylliba schneirlai Elzinga
 Trichocylliba suctorpoda Elzinga
 Trichocylliba watkinsi Elzinga

References

Uropodidae
Articles created by Qbugbot